The Concept Composites MD03 Transat is a French amphibious flying boat ultralight and light-sport aircraft that was designed and produced by Concept Composites of Pouancé. The aircraft is supplied as a complete ready-to-fly-aircraft.

Design and development
The Transat was designed to comply with both French microlight and US light-sport aircraft rules. It features a biplane layout with two seats in side-by-side configuration within an enclosed cockpit, fixed conventional landing gear and a single engine in pusher configuration.

The aircraft fuselage is made from composites, with its flying surfaces covered in doped aircraft fabric. The standard powerplant is a  BMW 1100RS fuel injected, four-stroke engine. The landing gear is retracted electrically, with a back-up manual system. The Transat is advertised as the only amphibious microlight that can take-off from water at maximum gross weight in under 15 seconds.

Specifications (MD03 Transat)

See also
AAC SeaStar

References

External links

2000s French ultralight aircraft
Light-sport aircraft
Single-engined pusher aircraft